Zdeněk Tůma (born 19 October 1960) is a Czech economist, who was the Governor of the Czech National Bank from 1 December 2000 to 30 June 2010. He had previously served as Vice Governor of the Bank from 13 February 1999 to 30 November 2000.

Career
Tůma was born in 1960 in Ceske Budejovice. After graduating from the Faculty of Trade at the University of Economics, Prague, he became an assistant professor at the same institution. He subsequently joined the Institute for Forecasting of the Czechoslovak Academy of Sciences as a researcher, and then the Faculty of Social Sciences at Charles University, where he was Director of the Department for Macroeconomics. From 1993 to 1995 he was an adviser to the Minister of Industry and Trade. From 1996 to 1998 he worked in the private sector, including a spell in London as an Executive Director of the European Bank for Reconstruction and Development.

Tůma returned to Prague in 1998 and joined the Czech National Bank, as vice-governor. He was appointed as Governor of the Czech National Bank on 1 December 2000, and was confirmed by President Václav Klaus for another six-year term on 11 February 2005. He resigned on 30 June 2010. According to iHNed.cz Governor Tůma's salary was $220,000.

He was the candidate of TOP 09 to become the Mayor of Prague in local elections in October 2010. Though TOP 09 won the most votes, they were unable to form a coalition with any other parties. The second- and third-place parties (ODS and ČSSD) instead formed a coalition and Bohuslav Svoboda was elected Mayor by the City Council on 30 November 2010.

Since 2011 Tůma has returned to the private sector, working in financial services for KPMG. He also chairs the CERGE-EI Nadace (Foundation), which supports economic education in transition and developing countries. He also serves on the board of advisors for the Global Panel Foundation, an NGO that works behind the scenes in crisis areas around the world. He also lectures at Charles University in Prague.

In 2016 Tůma received the Hanno R. Ellenbogen Citizenship Award for his dedication to public service.

References

External links
 Official biography

1960 births
Living people
20th-century Czech economists
People from České Budějovice
TOP 09 politicians
Prague University of Economics and Business alumni
Governors of the Czech National Bank
21st-century Czech economists
Czechoslovak economists